"Again" is the fourth single by American rapper Fetty Wap from his self-titled debut album. It peaked at number 33 on the Billboard Hot 100.

Commercial performance
"Again" was the highest-ranking debut on the Billboard Hot 100 chart dated August 29, 2015, entering at number 33. Its debut was fueled by first-week digital download sales of 88,000 copies. It concurrently debuted at number eight on the Hot Rap Songs chart while Wap's former three singles "Trap Queen", "679", and "My Way" were still in the chart's top ten; this made Wap the first act in the chart's history to simultaneously chart his first four singles in that region.

Charts

Weekly charts

Year-end charts

Certifications

References

External links

2014 songs
2015 singles
Fetty Wap songs
Songs written by Fetty Wap
300 Entertainment singles

American contemporary R&B songs